Seath may refer to:

 David Seath (1914–1947), New Zealand politician
 Ethel Seath (1879–1963), Canadian artist
 Seath Holswich (born 1977), Australian politician
 T. B. Seath & Co., a former shipbuilding company at Shawfield,  Rutherglen, Scotland

See also
 Seth (disambiguation)